Sally Jackson is an academic.

Sally Jackson may also refer to:

Sally Jackson (Percy Jackson), mother of Percy Jackson
Sally Bundock (born Sally Jackson), news presenter